Tarsis Gracious Orogot (born 24 November 2002) is a Ugandan sprinter.

Orogot gained his first experience at international championships in 2021, when he finished fourth in the 200 meter dash at the U20 World Championships in Nairobi in 20.57 s and set a Ugandan national record in the semifinals with 20.37 s. He also reached the semifinals in the 100m, where he was eliminated with a time of 10.37s.
He represents Uganda at the 2022 World Athletics Championships.

In 2023, running for the University of Alabama, he ran 20.20 for 200m indoors to set a world-leading mark in Albuquerque. This mark is an Ugandan record.

Personal bests
100 m: 10.35s (+1.4 m/s), 1 July 2021 in Nairobi (Uganda record)
200 m: 20.32 s (-0.1 m/s), 8 June 2022 in Eugene (Uganda record)

References

2002 births
Living people
Commonwealth Games competitors for Uganda
Ugandan male sprinters